Kalanchoe manginii, beach bells, is a species of flowering plant in the family Crassulaceae, native to Madagascar.

This plant has gained the Royal Horticultural Society's Award of Garden Merit.

Gallery

References

House plants
manginii
Endemic flora of Madagascar
Taxa named by Joseph Marie Henry Alfred Perrier de la Bâthie